The Charlotte Hornets are a professional basketball club based in Charlotte, North Carolina. They are members of the National Basketball Association (NBA), playing in the Southeast Division of the Eastern Conference. The original Charlotte Hornets franchise played in Charlotte from 1988 to 2002, before relocating to New Orleans, Louisiana and becoming the New Orleans Hornets. A new franchise, the Charlotte Bobcats, began play in the 2004–05 season. In 2014, the Bobcats adopted the Hornets name and acquired the history and records of the original Charlotte Hornets.

Seasons

All-time records
Statistics are correct as of the conclusion of the 2021–22 NBA season.

Notes

References

External links
Basketball-Reference – Charlotte Hornets

 
 
seasons